The Women's Tour of California is the women's event of the Tour of California, an annual road bicycle racing event in California, United States. Raced over four stages, the event usually finishes with a criterium stage in Sacramento. It is organized by Anschutz Entertainment Group and part of the UCI Women's World Tour. Dutch rider and 2016 Olympic road race champion Anna van der Breggen won the race twice, in 2017, and 2018.

Winners

References

External links

2015 establishments in California
Cycle races in the United States
Recurring sporting events established in 2015
UCI Women's World Tour races
Spring (season) events in the United States